"Honky Tonk Train Blues" is a song written by Meade Lux Lewis, and first recorded in 1927. A proto boogie-woogie song, it has many of the traits that would come to be identified with rock and roll. It is also the first recorded use of the term "honky-tonk" in a song.

History
The single, when first released, sold poorly, and Lux ended up working in a car wash for a living, but it was later heard by John Hammond, who found Lux and hired him to record the song again, initially releasing it in Europe. In 1937 he re-recorded it again, releasing the song in the US, where it was a hit, subsequently touring the country in a series of concerts that helped popularize boogie-woogie.

Legacy
It has gone on to be recorded in various contexts, often in a big band arrangement. Early recordings of the piece by artists other than Lewis include performances by Adrian Rollini, Frankie Trumbauer, classical harpsichordist Sylvia Marlowe, theater organist George Wright (with drummer Cozy Cole, under the title "Organ Boogie"), and Bob Zurke with Bob Crosby's orchestra.

 1935 — Albert Ammons
 1938 — Bob Crosby - Boogie Woogie Instrumental Featuring Bob Zurke At The Piano 
 Benny Goodman
 1939 — Jimmy Yancey
 1963 — Rob Hoeke - Boogie Woogie Quartet
 1968 — Claude Bolling
 1974 — Björn J:son Lindh
 1976 — Keith Emerson
 1997 — David Maxwell

Keith Emerson often included it in his repertoire, and his recording of it was a Top 30 hit in the UK Singles Chart.

References

External links
 Honky Tonk Train Blues — 1929 youtube.com

Rock-and-roll songs
Boogie-woogie songs
1927 songs